Kirkland is an unincorporated community in Atkinson County, in the U.S. state of Georgia.

History
A post office called Kirkland was established in 1875, and remained in operation until 1954. The community was named after Joseph Kirkland, a local landowner.

References

Unincorporated communities in Atkinson County, Georgia
Unincorporated communities in Georgia (U.S. state)